Mohammad Raad (born 1 January 1955) is a Lebanese politician of Hezbollah, who serves as member of parliament representing Nabatiyeh district. He presides Loyalty to the Resistance Bloc in the Lebanese parliament, which is part of the 8 March Alliance.

Early life and education
Raad was born into a Shia family in Beirut in 1955. His family is originally from the village of Jbaa in South Lebanon. He holds a bachelor's degree in philosophy, which he received from Lebanese University.

Career
Raad is one of the leading figures of Hezbollah and the only member of the party to occupy his seat in Parliament (representing Nabatiyah) since 1992. He is one of the "ideologues" of the party, a member of its executive committee and former chair of its political council. Raad has been a key political player and has been elected by the Iranian Majlis as Lebanon's only representative on the Iranian Guardian Council. He won a seat from Nabatiyeh in the general elections held in 2000. He has been president of the Hezbollah's Block loyalty to the Resistance since 2000.

Following the military action of July–August 2006 conducted by Israel against the Lebanon, and with the resumption of dialogue sessions headed by Nabih Berri, Hassan Nasrallah appointed Mohammad Raad as personal representative on the negotiating table.

Raad is among potential candidates for general secretary of Hezbollah if Nasrallah will be "supreme guide" of the organization and the power allocated to the post of general secretary will be reduced.

See also
 Members of the 2009-2013 Lebanese Parliament

References

1955 births
Living people
Lebanese University alumni
Members of the Parliament of Lebanon
Lebanese Shia Muslims
Hezbollah politicians